The 2020 SheBelieves Cup was the fifth edition of the SheBelieves Cup, an invitational women's soccer tournament held in the United States.

Featuring national teams from Spain, England, Japan, and hosts United States, it began on March 5 and ended on March 11, 2020, making it the last soccer tournament in the United States to be completed before the COVID-19 pandemic shut down all professional sports in the country. Apart from host United States, England were the only other team to have featured in every tournament. 2020 was Japan's second appearance following their debut in 2019, while it was the first time Spain had taken part.

England were the defending champions.

The United States won their third overall title.

Format
The four invited teams played a round-robin tournament. Points awarded in the group stage followed the formula of three points for a win, one point for a draw, and zero points for a loss. A tie in points would be decided by goal differential; other tie-breakers are listed below.

Venues

Squads

Teams

Standings

Results

Goalscorers

References

2020
2020 in women's association football
2020 in American women's soccer
2019–20 in English women's football
2020 in Japanese women's sport
2020 in Japanese football
2019–20 in Spanish women's football
March 2020 sports events in the United States
2020 in sports in Florida
2020 in sports in New Jersey
2020 in sports in Texas
Soccer in Florida